About 29 geothermal springs has been identified in Nepal mostly located in the banks of Mahakali, Karnali, Tila, Kaligandaki, Myagdi, Marshyangdi,  Trishuli, and Bhotekoshi rivers. Twenty three of them are officially recognized by the Nepal government.The source of heat is the Main Central Thrust. 

The list of geo-thermal springs in Nepal is shown in the table below which includes the chemical composition along with temperature and pH.

References

Nepal
Lists of landforms of Nepal
Lists of tourist attractions in Nepal